Oktyabrskoye Pole is a station on the Tagansko-Krasnopresnenskaya Line of the Moscow Metro. The station was opened on 30 December 1972 as part of the Krasnopresnenskiy radius, and for exactly three years it was the original terminus of the Krasnopresnenskaya Line. The station received its name from a nearby locality which was initially known as Voyennoye Pole (Military Field) and as Oktyabrskoye Pole (October Field, named after October Revolution) since 1922, during the Soviet era.

Designed by Nina Alyoshina and L. Zaitseva, the station features a typical pillar-trispan "Novaya Sorokonozhka" design, with polygonal aluminium coated pillars and walls with bright-grey coloured marble decorated with anodized aluminium artworks (artists Bodnieks and Rysin). The floor is coated white marble except for the area around the pillars where it gives way to black granite. The two vestibules are interlinked with subways that allow access to Narodnogo Opolcheniya Street and Marshala Biryuzova Street.

The station has a daily passenger flow of 75,910 people.

External links
Yuri Gridchin's Site.
KartaMetro.info — Station location and exits on Moscow map (English/Russian)

Moscow Metro stations
Railway stations in Russia opened in 1972
Tagansko-Krasnopresnenskaya Line
1972 establishments in the Soviet Union
Railway stations located underground in Russia